Paradise Valley is a 1934 American western film directed by James P. Hogan and starring Jean Chatburn, Wheeler Oakman and Walter Brennan. It was an independent production made on Poverty Row.

Synopsis
A radio singer tires of life in the big city and moves into the country in a valley where a long-standing battle has been raging between sheepherders and cattlemen. His dog Gandhi is quickly but wrongly suspected of killing sheep.

Cast
Sam Pierce as 	'Wing' Bonner
 Jean Chatburn as 	Peggy Crawford 
 Wheeler Oakman as 	'Smiley' Mason
 Arthur Loft as Sanchez
 Jimmy Aubrey as Scotty
 Si Jenks as Si
 Donny Baker as 	Jimmy Crawford
 Aleth Hansen as 	Lazy Bones 
 Walter Brennan as Farmer Hiram
 Don Paul as 	Singing Cowboy
 The Beverly Hillbillies	as Western Band
 Zanda the Dog as	Gandhi

References

Bibliography
 Pitts, Michael R. Poverty Row Studios, 1929–1940. McFarland & Company, 2005.

External links
 

1934 films
1934 Western (genre) films
1930s English-language films
American Western (genre) films
Films directed by James Patrick Hogan
American black-and-white films
1930s American films